Yanadani Dam is a gravity dam located in Ehime Prefecture in Japan. The dam is used for power production. The catchment area of the dam is 128 km2. The dam impounds about 6  ha of land when full and can store 270 thousand cubic meters of water. The construction of the dam was started on 1984 and completed in 1989.

References

Dams in Ehime Prefecture
1989 establishments in Japan